"Dreamland Express" is a song written and recorded by American singer-songwriter John Denver. It was released in November 1985 as the second single from the album of the same name. The song was a minor crossover hit and peaked at number 9 on the Billboard Hot Country Singles chart and number 34 on the Adult Contemporary chart.

The song is the last track on the 1998 reissue of Rocky Mountain Christmas.

Chart performance

References

1985 songs
1985 singles
John Denver songs
RCA Records singles
Songs written by John Denver